In the last 100-plus years, the Chicago White Sox have had many players with colorful and memorable nicknames from "Shoeless Joe" Jackson to "Old Aches & Pains" Appling, Minnie the "Cuban Comet" Minoso, "Little Louie" Aparicio, "Black Jack" McDowell, and Frank "The Big Hurt" Thomas.  These are some of the best.

Dick Allen: "Wampum"
Sandy Alomar Sr.: "Iron Pony"
Luis Aparicio: "Little Louie"
Luke Appling: "Fumblefoot" or "Kid Boots" or "Old Aches & Pains"
Cuke Barrows, Roland Barrows: "Cuke"
Bruno Block, James John Blochowicz: "Bruno"
Ken Boyer: "Cap" or "Captain"
Smoky Burgess, Forrest Harrill Burgess: "Smoky"
Iván Calderón: "Ivan The Terrible"
Norm Cash: "Stormin’ Norman"
Eddie Cicotte: "Knuckles"
Rocky Colavito, Rocco Colavito: "Rocky"
Eddie Collins: "Cocky"
José Contreras: "Commander"
Joe Crede: "Clutch Norris"
Bucky Dent, Russell Earl O’Day: "Bucky" or "Bucky 'Fucking' Dent"
Octavio Dotel: "Ol' Dirty"
Richard Dotson: "Dot"
Brian Downing: "Incredible Hulk"
Red Faber, Urban Clarence Faber: "Red"
Carlton Fisk: "Pudge"
Nellie Fox,  Jacob Nelson Fox,: "Nellie", "Little Nel", or "The Mighty Mite"
Freddy García: "Chief"
Ralph Garr: "Road Runner"
Kid Gleason, William Gleason: "Kid"
Goose Gossage, Richard Michael Gossage: "Goose" or "The White Gorilla"
Craig Grebeck: "The Little Hurt"
Orlando Hernández: "El Duque"
Bo Jackson,  Vincent Edward Jackson: "Bo"
Joe Jackson: "Shoeless Joe"
Bobby Jenks: "Big Bad Bobby Jenks"
Lance Johnson: "One Dog"
Ron Karkovice: “The Officer”
Ted Kluszewski: "Big Klu"
Paul Konerko: "Paulie"
Carlos Lee: "El Caballo"
Ted Lyons: "Sunday Teddy"
Jack McDowell: "Black Jack"
Catfish Metkovich, George Michael Metkovich: "Catfish"
Minnie Miñoso, Saturnino Orestes Armas (Arrieta) Miñoso: "Minnie" or "The Cuban Comet"
Dave Nicholson, "Big Nick"
Blue Moon Odom, Johnny Lee Odom: "Blue Moon"
Magglio Ordóñez: "El Caribe Mayor (The Caribbean Mayor)" or "Mags"
Tom Paciorek: "Wimpy"
Don Pall: "The Pope"
Herbert Perry: "The Milkman"
Bubba Phillips, John Melvin Phillips: "Bubba"
Billy Pierce: "Billy the Kid"
Scott Podsednik: "Pods"
Carlos Quentin: "TCQ"
Tim Raines: "Rock"
Alexei Ramírez: "The Cuban Missile"
Ray Schalk: "The Cracker"
Tom Seaver: "Tom Terrific"
Bill Skowron: "Moose"
Moose Solters, Julius Joseph Soltesz: "Moose" or "Lemons"
Nick Swisher: "Dirty Thirty"
Frank Thomas: "The Big Hurt"
Jim Thome: "Big Jimmy" or "Mr. Incredible"
Javier Vázquez: "The Silent Assassin"
Robin Ventura: "Batman"
Dayán Viciedo: "The Tank"
Ed Walsh: "Big Ed"
Skeeter Webb,  James Laverne Webb: "Skeeter"
Hoyt Wilhelm: "Old Sarge"
Walt Williams: "No Neck"
Taffy Wright,  Taft Shedron Wright:: "Taffy"
Early Wynn: "Gus"
Nick Madrigal: "Nicky Two Strikes'''"

See also
Chicago White Sox
Chicago White Sox all-time roster
Detroit Tigers Nicknames
White Sox award winners and league leaders
White Sox broadcasters and media
White Sox managers and ownership

Sources
Unless other sourcing is indicated, all nicknames cited in this article are verified from one of the following two authoritative sources:
Baseball-Reference
Baseball Almanac
nick-madrigal-doubles-home-winning-run-for-white-sox

Nicknames
Nicknames
Chicago White Sox
Chicago
Chicago|